Thomas Collingwood  (c.1730 – 1780) was a British Royal Navy commander, who served on the , , and , among others. Collingwood played an important role in the Battle of Grenada and the Battle of Martinique (1780).

Life and career
Thomas Collingwood was promoted to lieutenant on October 28, 1750.

On September 9, 1756, he was assigned command of the ship , a tiny, swift vessel employed for communications that was used to transmit Vice Admiral Sir Edward Hawke's messages from Minorca to Barcelona. Collingwood used the Fortune to capture a French xebec in the port of Marseilles, in addition to messenger services. He was promoted to captain two months later and given command of the frigate .

The Siren was stationed in the Mediterranean around Sardinia and chased the French man-of-war "La Nymphe" from Sardinia to the Barbary Coast in February 1757 but was unable to catch her or engage in combat. On March 25, 1757, she travelled to Cagliari to assist  in escort duties: despite six French men-of-war patrolling the seas, they were able to transport 20 commercial ships from Cagliari to Gibraltar through Leghorn with no casualties.

A newly outfitted French warship assaulted her off the coast of Cape Spartel in December 1757. The Siren was victorious after a 90-minute struggle. This sparked an issue in Morocco, where the British consul, James Read, was asked to make reparations on Britain's behalf for the ship's loss. He resisted and was imprisoned and tortured as a result. On February 18, 1758, Read committed himself by shooting himself with his gun.

Meanwhile, Siren landed in Leghorn on January 29 with seven fishing vessels she had escorted from Gibraltar. She then took part in a convoy from Gibraltar to Portsmouth before being paid off temporarily to undergo significant repairs.

Collingwood had a spell of shore leave from June to October 1758 before gaining command of the newly launched , which he subsequently carried to the Leeward Islands in the Caribbean as part of the activities against the French fleet there. On February 22, 1759, he was dispatched to look for French ships harassing British ships off the coast of the Isle of Wight. He fought and captured five French ships in different actions between August 1759 and March 1761. The British ship "Berkeley," which had been taken under the name "Le Berkeley," was among them. He was a member of the British navy that seized Martinique in January 1762.

In September 1762, he was promoted to captain of the  due to his continued performance. In October, he set out to return her to England, but she capsized in the shallows near Cape Clear on December 18, 1762. Collingwood and the majority of the crew survived the accident, although it took some time to assign Collingwood a new command, as was customary in such situations, especially with a new ship.

Tweed's lone notable assignment was an envoy voyage to Russia (possibly mooring in St Petersburg).

However, command was transferred to Captain William Cumming before to Monmouth's participation in the Battle of Grenada. Collingwood consequently took part in the Battle of Grenada on Fame rather than Monmouth on July 6. Collingwood was transferred aboard  eight days after the engagement, most likely owing to Fame damage. Grafton was involved in the same conflict but appears to have escaped unharmed.

Two weeks after Collingwood took command of Grafton, the ship was promoted to flagship status in the Royal Navy, with Collingwood serving as Flag Officer. In this capacity, he was a key figure in the Battle of Martinique on April 17, 1780. Collingwood attributed the British defeat on his inability to appropriately alert other ships and his detachment from his own squadron. Admiral Rodney disagreed and attempted unsuccessfully to ease his guilt.

Collingwood died one day after the decision to send him home was made. On June 2, 1780, he was buried at sea.

Family
He was married to Mary Hughes (d.1824) daughter of Sir Richard Hughes Her great nephew Sir Thomas Collingwood Hughes (1800-1889) the 8th baronet of her father's line, was named in Collingwood's honour.

References
 

1780 deaths
Royal Navy officers
Shipwreck survivors